The Delhi–Meerut Regional Rapid Transit System (Delhi–Meerut RRTS) is an  long, semi-high speed rail corridor currently under construction which will connect Delhi, Ghaziabad, and Meerut. It is one of the three rapid rail corridors planned under Phase I of the Regional Rapid Transit System (RRTS) project managed by the National Capital Region Transport Corporation (NCRTC). The project will cost  and will have 24 stations, including two depots at Duhai and Modipuram.

History 
On 8 March 2019, Prime Minister Narendra Modi laid the foundation stone of the corridor. Local transit services will also be provided on the Delhi-Meerut RRTS network in Meerut with  allotted for local transit needs.

Following the Galwan Valley skirmish on 15 June 2020, there were calls by Swadeshi Jagran Manch for the Government to cancel the bid of a Chinese company related to the transit system. The trains are being built by Alstom's manufacturing plant in Savli, Gujarat.

Route 
 Length of the corridor: 
 No. of stations: 14
 Names of stations: Sarai Kale Khan, New Ashok Nagar, Anand Vihar, Sahibabad, Ghaziabad, Guldhar, Duhai, Muradnagar, Modinagar South, Modinagar North, Meerut South, Shatabdi Nagar, Begumpul and Modipuram.
 No. of depots: 2
 Names of depots: Duhai and Modipuram.

8 stations were constructed exclusively for local transit services in Meerut: Partapur, Rithani, Brahmapuri, Meerut Central, Bhaisali, MES Colony, Daurli and Meerut North.

4 stations for which both RRTS and local transit services in Meerut will be provided: Meerut South, Shatabdi Nagar, Begumpul and Modipuram.

Of the entire length,  is elevated,  is underground. and  will be at grade for connections to two depots to  be located at Duhai and Modipuram. In densely populated areas of Delhi and Meerut the route will be underground including near the Yamuna river.

The Delhi-Meerut corridor starts from Sarai Kale Khan station in Delhi. The corridor will pass through areas of Delhi, Ghaziabad, and Meerut; terminating at Modipuram in Meerut.

Sarai Kale Khan will also become a transit hub with the Sarai Kale Khan - Nizamuddin metro station, the Sarai Kale Khan ISBT, and the Hazrat Nizamuddin railway station in vicinity.

There will be a total of 16 stations. Multimodal transport hubs will be combined with existing transportation such as Delhi Metro, Indian Railways, and Uttar Pradesh State Road Transport Corporation (UPSRTC) bus terminals (planned at Anand Vihar, Sahibabad and Shaheed Sthal stations).

Key features 

 The Delhi-Ghaziabad-Meerut RRTS corridor is the first RRTS corridor to be implemented in India.
 Multi-Modal Integration: RRTS stations will be integrated with various modes of transport like Airports, Railway Stations, Inter-State Bus Terminals, Delhi Metro Stations etc. It will facilitate the movement of commuters between modes.
 Platform Screen Doors: All of the RRTS stations will have platform screen doors for enhanced commuter safety.
 The implementation of the Delhi-Ghaziabad-Meerut RRTS Corridor is expected to shift the modal share in favour of public transport from 37% to 63% in the region, which is projected to result in a reduction in traffic.
 As per estimates, this corridor will significantly reduce air pollutants, namely PM 2.5 by 60,000 tonnes, Nitrogen Oxide by 475,000 tonnes, Hydrocarbons by 80,000 tonnes and Carbon Monoxide by 80,000 tonnes per year.

Source of funding 

 Multilateral Funding: About $1 billion from Asian Development Bank (ADB), $500 million from New Development Bank (NDB) and $500 million from Asian Infrastructure Investment Bank (AIIB).
 Contribution from governments: From Government of India: 20%, from Government of Delhi: 3.22%, and from Government of Uttar Pradesh: 16.78%.

Signalling and train control system 
The National Capital Region Transport Corporation has decided to equip the line with ETCS L2 signalling. Tenders for its procurement were invited on 17 April 2020.

Rolling stock 
 
On 1 May 2020, Alstom emerged as the lowest bidder among a group of three bidders to supply and maintain 210 coaches. The coaches will be built in Alstom's plant in Gujarat. The entire rolling stock for the Delhi-Ghaziabad-Meerut RRTS corridor will be manufactured in India. In 2020 the NCRTC announced what the RRTS trains would look like.

Status updates 
 May 2017: The Government of Uttar Pradesh approved the Detailed Project Report (DPR) for the Delhi-Meerut RRTS project.
 Feb 2019: The Central Government approved ₹ 30,274 crores for the Delhi-Meerut RRTS project.
 Mar 2019: Prime Minister Narendra Modi laid the foundation stone for this project.
  Jun 2019: Pillar construction work started.
 Feb 2021: The construction of the Anand Vihar Station of Delhi-Meerut RRTS corridor began.
 Apr 2021: Track laying started for the Ghaziabad section of the corridor.
 Jun 2021: The first elevated section pier (namely for the Sarai Kale Khan section) is constructed.
 Jun 2021: Construction work on the first part of the underground portion of began (in Anand Vihar).
 Jul 2021: The piers were completed for the  elevated stretch.
 Jul 2021: Alstom began manufacturing 210 trains. These will be manufactured in Alstom's manufacturing plant in Savli, Gujarat.
 Aug 2021: It was announced that 650 hectares of land between Guldhar and Duhai RRTS Stations will be developed as a commercial, residential and industrial hub.
 Aug 2021: Construction work on the second underground section began in Meerut.
 Sep 2021: The installation of Overhead Equipment (OHE) lines began.
 Oct 2021: Tenders was issued for the construction of the Modipuram depot.
 Dec 2021: Datamatics Global Services – AEP Ticketing Solutions JV was awarded a Rs. 227 crore Contract for the AFC System.
 Jan 2022: Nokia and Alstom deployed a private wireless network system based on LTE/4.9G with support for ETCS-II signalling.
 Mar 2022: The NCRTC unveiled the first images of the RRTS trains, which will be used for operations after the completion of the construction of the priority corridor.
 Mar 2022: The tunneling work for the underground section of the RRTS corridor in Meerut began.
 Mar 2022: Paytm Payments Bank won the bid for becoming the financial institution responsible for the fare system, beating the State Bank of India.
 Apr 2022: Roughly 25% of the corridor was completed.
 May 2022: Alstom manufactured the first train in Savli, Gujarat.
 Aug 2022: First trial of the first trainset has been successfully completed.

 Feb 2023: The trial runs for the trains, including high-speed tests, have been completed, and now there are a total of six trains. The 17-km priority corridor from Sahibabad to Duhai is at its final stages of work, and is confirmed to be opened by mid-June 2023. The second stretch from Duhai to South Meerut will be opened by the first quarter of 2024, and the entire corridor will become operational by March 2025.

See also 
 Delhi–Alwar Regional Rapid Transit System
 Delhi–Panipat Regional Rapid Transit System

References 

Transport in Delhi
Transport in Meerut
Proposed railway lines in India
Proposed infrastructure in Uttar Pradesh
National Capital Region (India)